Charles James Stranks (10 May 1901 – 30 August 1981) was a British Anglican priest and author.

Stranks was born in Buckinghamshire, educated at Durham University and St Boniface College, Warminster; and ordained in 1926. After a curacy in Leeds he was a missionary in Japan from 1928 to 1940. He was the Vicar of Morecambe from 1941 to 1947; Warden of Whalley Abbey from 1947 from 1947 to 1953; a Canon at Durham University from 1954; and Archdeacon of Auckland from 1958 to 1973.

References

1901 births
Alumni of St Chad's College, Durham
Archdeacons of Auckland
1981 deaths
Alumni of St Boniface Missionary College, Warminster
People from Buckinghamshire